Melinsey is a hamlet south of Ruan High Lanes in Cornwall, England. The name is derived from the Cornish word "melinjy" which means "mill house".

Melinsey Watermill dates from the Middle Ages and has been restored to working order. It was originally built to grind wheat into food for livestock. It has a Cafe specialising in Cornish cream teas and a craft shop.

References

Hamlets in Cornwall